Gennady Andreyevich Mesyats (February 29, 1936, Kemerovo, Russia) is a Russian physicist, founder of several scientific schools — high-current electronics and pulse electrophysics, one of the acknowledged world leaders in these areas.

He has been a vice-president of the Russian Academy of Sciences since 1987 and a director of the Lebedev Physical Institute since 2004. He was announced as the recipient of the IEEE Marie Sklodowska-Curie Award for 2012.

Honours and awards
 Gold and silver medal, a diploma of honour of the USSR Exhibition of Economic Achievements
 Order of Lenin (1986)
 Order of the Badge of Honour (1976)
 Order of the Red Banner of Labour (1971)
 Order of Merit for the Fatherland, 2nd class (2006), 3rd class (1999) and 4th class (1996)
 Jubilee Medal "For Valiant Labour. To commemorate the 100th anniversary of Lenin" (1970)
 Gold Medal of Academician NN Moiseev (2000s).
 Honour of the Komsomol (1960)
 Lenin Komsomol Prize (1968)
 USSR State Prize (1978)
 Winner of the State Prize of the Russian Federation for Science and Technology (1998)
 Laureate of the USSR Council of Ministers (1990)
 Dyke Award (1990),
 Demidov Prize (2002)
 Global Energy Prize (2003)
 Honorary Citizen of the Tomsk Oblast
 Honorary citizen of Yekaterinburg
 Chevalier of the Légion d'honneur (France, 2008)
 Order of Honour (2011)
 Elected a member of the National Academy of Engineering for the development and application of pulsed power technology (2012)

References

External links
Gennady Mesyats at the Russian Academy of Sciences website

1936 births
Living people
People from Kemerovo
Russian physicists
Full Members of the USSR Academy of Sciences
Full Members of the Russian Academy of Sciences
Honorary Members of the Russian Academy of Education
Tomsk Polytechnic University alumni
Academic staff of Tomsk State University
Academic staff of Tomsk Polytechnic University
Academic staff of the Moscow Institute of Physics and Technology
Recipients of the Order "For Merit to the Fatherland", 2nd class
Recipients of the Order of Lenin
Recipients of the Order of Honour (Russia)
Chevaliers of the Légion d'honneur
Demidov Prize laureates
Recipients of the USSR State Prize
State Prize of the Russian Federation laureates
Recipients of the Lenin Komsomol Prize